Parada Inglesa is a metro station on São Paulo Metro Line 1-Blue, located in the district of Tucuruvi, in São Paulo.

Belongs to the Line 1 north expansion plan, initiated in 1996. It would be named Paulicéia Station, according to the original project.

It was opened on 29 April 1998, along with stations Jardim São Paulo-Ayrton Senna and Tucuruvi. The project of the station was one of the awarded in the 5th Architecture Biennal of Buenos Aires, in the category Prémio Especial Del Jurado (Special Jury Award).

Location
It is located in Avenida Luís Dumont Vilares, 1721, an avenue which mixes residential areas and restaurants. It's in the district of Tucuruvi, in North Side São Paulo. It's also connected to a bus terminal, with destination to local lines.

Characteristics
It has exits to Rua Professor Marcondes Domingues and to Avenida Luís Dumont Vilares, this last one with access for people with disabilities. It also has a distribution mezzanine under the platforms, besides connection with an urban bus terminal.

References

São Paulo Metro stations
Railway stations opened in 1998